Carr Valley [elevation: ] is a valley in Sauk County, in the U.S. state of Wisconsin. The valley carries a stream, Carr Valley Branch.

Carr Valley was named for David Carr.

References

Landforms of Sauk County, Wisconsin
Valleys of Wisconsin